Michael Baldwin (born 1945 in Chipping Norton, Oxfordshire, England; lives in Middleton Cheney, near Banbury, England) is a British conceptual artist, author and founding member of the Art & Language artist group.

Life and work
Michael Baldwin studied at Coventry College of Art from 1964 to 1967 and taught at Lanchester Polytechnic in Coventry from 1969 to 1971 and at Leamington School of Art from 1969.

Mirror piece is an installation of variable dimensions he created in 1965. It is composed of multiple mirrors of different sizes covered with regular or deforming glass plates, presented on wooden panels. This installation is accompanied by a protocol and text panels.

Michael Baldwin met the artist Terry Atkinson in 1966 at Coventry College of Art, where Atkinson taught. They founded the avant-garde Art & Language group in 1968.

As a member of Art & Language in 1972, Michael Baldwin took part in Documenta 5 in Kassel with the project Index 0001 in the Idea + Idea/Light section, together with the Art & Language artists Terry Atkinson, David Bainbridge, Ian Burn, Charles Harrison, Harold Hurrell, Mel Ramsden and Joseph Kosuth. With Art & Language he was also represented at Documenta 6 (1977), Documenta 7 in 1982 and Documenta X in 1997.

Since 1977, Baldwin and Ramsden have continued Art & Language as a project. Many texts were written with Charles Harrison and Mel Ramsden, who has been publishing "Art-Language" since 1971.

References

 Exhibition catalogue: documenta 5: Questioning reality – visual worlds today. Catalogue (as file) Volume 1: (material); Volume 2: (list of exhibitions); Kassel 1972
 documenta Archiv (ed.): Wiedervorlage d5 – Eine Befragung des Archivs zum documenta 1972. Kassel/Ostfildern 2001, 
 Catalogue for documenta 6: Volume 1: Painting, Sculpture/Environment, Performance. Volume 2: Photography, Film, Video. Volume 3: Hand Drawings, Utopian Design, Books. Kassel 1977 
 Catalogue: documenta 7 Kassel. Volume 1: (Visual biographies of the artists); Volume 2: (Current works of the artists); Kassel 1982 
 (documenta 10 catalogue): Politics – Poetics – the book on documenta X. Kassel/Ostfildern 1997,  (German) /  (English)
 Marzona, Daniel: Conceptual Art. Cologne 2005

External links
 Examples of his works
 Art & Language: Blurting in A & L online

1945 births
Living people
People from Chipping Norton
Alumni of Coventry School of Art and Design
Artists from Oxfordshire
British conceptual artists
English contemporary artists
Art & Language